Mount Kring is a sharply defined nunatak on the northern margin of the upper reaches of David Glacier,  southwest of Mount Wood, in Oates Land, Antarctica. Previously uncharted, it was used (with Mount Wood) as a reference for establishing a United States Antarctic Research Program field party on November 6, 1962. The mountain was named by D.B.McC. Rainey of the Cartographic Branch of the New Zealand Department of Lands and Survey for Staff Sergeant Arthur L. Kring, United States Marine Corps, navigator on many U.S. Navy VX-6 Squadron flights during the 1962–63 season when New Zealand field parties received logistic support from that squadron.

References

Nunataks of Oates Land